Bangladeshi Americans are Americans of Bangladeshi descent. The majority of Bangladeshi Americans are Bengalis and form the largest group of Bengali Americans. Bangladeshi immigrants have arrived in the United States in large numbers since the early 1970s to become among the fastest growing ethnic communities since that decade. New York City, home to two-thirds of the Bangladeshi American population; Paterson, New Jersey; Atlantic City, New Jersey; Buffalo, New York; as well as Philadelphia, Pennsylvania, Los Angeles, Boston, Atlanta, San Francisco, Detroit, Chicago, Florida, Dallas, Houston, Charlotte, Austin, Hamtramck, Michigan, and Reno, Nevada are home to notable Bangladeshi communities.

History 

Immigrants from present-day Bangladesh have been in the United States since at least the 1880s during the British Raj.

Bangladeshis have been migrating to the port cities of the United States since 1974 when 154 Bangladeshis arrived in United States leaving behind the hard economic and political times of the still developing Bangladesh who got independence from Pakistan in 1971. Most were workers on the various ships docking from Chittagong, Bangladesh.

Immigration to the United States from Bangladesh grew slowly but steadily through the 1970s and 1980s. Over ten thousand Bangladeshis have immigrated to the United States annually. Many of the migrants settled in urban areas. New York City is home to two-thirds of the Bangladeshi population in the United States. Other cities including Paterson and Atlantic City, New Jersey, Buffalo, New York, as well as Washington, D.C., Los Angeles, Boston, Chicago, and Detroit. In New York, it was estimated that 15,000 Bangladeshis resided in the city in the early 1980s. During the late 1970s, some Bangladeshis moved from New York City to Detroit, and Atlantic City for jobs. Homes to prominent communities of other Muslim Americans, in search of better work opportunities and an affordable cost of living, but most have since returned from Detroit to New York and to New Jersey, in hope of starting a new community and a peaceful life. The Los Angeles Bangladesh Association was created in 1971, and there were 500 members of the Texas Bangladesh Association in 1997. In Atlantic City, Bangladeshis created an association. The Bangladeshi population in Dallas was 5,000 people in 1997, which was large enough to hold the Baishakhi Mela event. Baishakhi Mela events have been held in major American cities such as New York City, Paterson in New Jersey, Atlantic City, Washington, D.C., and Los Angeles, as the Bangladeshi population continues to increase in these cities.  The third and largest wave of arrivals came in the 1990s and 2000s. Because of the Diversity Immigrant Visa Program, professional and educational criteria were not used. Most entered blue-collar jobs, such as taxi driving, and restaurant help.

Demography

States, Cities, and Metro Areas by Population 
Bangladeshi Americans are largely concentrated in metropolitan areas in the Northeast, Mid-Atlantic, and Great Lakes regions of the country, in places such as working-class neighborhoods and suburbs. There are smaller concentrations in states such as Texas, California, and Nevada.

The states with the highest percentage of Bangladeshi Americans are:

 New York - 0.37%, 72.1 thousand Bangladeshis. Highest Bangladeshi population in the country.
 Michigan - 0.12%, 10,000 population
 New Jersey - 0.11%, 11,000 population
 Maryland - 0.1%, 4,000 population
 Virginia - 0.09%, 7,800 population
 Connecticut - 0.07%, 2,600 population

Some of the cities with the highest percentage of Bangladeshi Americans are:

 Hamtramck, Michigan - 10.5%
 Atlantic City, New Jersey - 4.8%
 Center Line, Michigan - 3.3%
 Hyattsville, Maryland - 2.9%
 Seven Corners, Virginia - 2.7%
 Warren, Michigan - 1.8%
 Paterson, New Jersey - 1.7%
 Lincolnia, Virginia - 1.37%
 Bailey's Crossroads, Virginia - 1.20%
 Greenbelt, Maryland - 1.05%
 Manchester, Connecticut - 1%
 Elmont, New York - 0.91%
 New York City - 0.8%
 South Laurel, Maryland - 0.69%
 Arlington, Virginia - 0.6%
 Detroit - 0.5%
 Fayetteville, Arkansas - 0.47%
 Waterbury, Connecticut - 0.41%
 Irving, Texas - 0.37%
 Reno, Nevada - 0.36%

The metropolitan areas with the highest percentage of Bangladeshi Americans are:

 New York City - 0.38%
 Detroit - 0.22%
 Washington D.C. - 0.17% (Concentrated in Northern Virginia and Prince George's County)
 Hartford - 0.11%
 Dallas - 0.08%
 Buffalo - 0.07%
 Philadelphia - 0.07%
 Atlanta - 0.07%

Major communities

New York City
New York City is home to the largest Bangladeshi community in the United States, receiving by far the highest legal permanent resident Bangladeshi immigrant population. The Bangladeshi-born immigrant population has become one of the fastest growing in New York City, counting over 74,000 by 2011 alone. The city's Bangladeshi community is spread out in the Jackson Heights neighborhood within the New York City borough of Queens. 74th Street has most of the Bangladeshi grocery stores and clothing stores in Jackson Heights. The Bangladesh Plaza hosts numerous Bangladeshi businesses and cultural events. Recently, one part of Jackson Heights has become the open platform of all sorts of protests and activism. The neighboring communities of Jackson Heights, Woodside, and Elmhurst in Queens also similarly have become attractive areas to live for Bangladeshi Americans.

Bangladeshi Americans created the Manhattan restaurant area "Curry Row" in the 1960s. Since the 1970s, thousands of Bangladeshis were able to legally migrate to the USA through the Diversity Visa Program/ lottery. Many initiated a migration to Jamaica, Queens. Continuous movement of Bangladeshis to Jamaica and Jackson Heights, Queens has made some neighborhoods extensively Bangladeshi. Centering on 169 street and Hillside Avenue, the neighborhood has become a popular zone due to the large number of restaurants and groceries. Sagar Restaurant, Gharoa, Deshi Shaad, Kabir's Bakery, and other stores in Queens are attractions for the Bangladeshi communities all over New York City. The largest numbers of Bangladeshi Americans now live in Jamaica, Jackson Heights, Hollis, and Briarwood in Queens. There is also a large Bangladeshi community in Parkchester, Bronx. Bangladeshi enclaves in Queens and Brooklyn have been increasing as Bangladeshis in NYC continue to grow rapidly. Bangladeshis form one of the fastest growing Asian ethnic groups in NYC as new enclaves in areas such as City Line and Ozone Park have sprung up. Wealthier Bangladeshis have been moving to Long Island, New York City, as a particular reason for popular settlement in the area is the pharmaceutical companies existing on Long Island; there are quite a large number of Bangladeshi-owned pharmaceutical companies in Nassau County and Suffolk County on Long Island employing many people of Bangladeshi origin. However, there have been a relatively small number of cases where Bangladeshis living in New York City moved out, specifically to places such as Buffalo, New York and Hamtramck in Michigan, mainly due to low living costs.

New York statistics:
 1990 census:
 Total population: 4,955 (5,406 in New York State and 11,838 in total in the United States).
 Highest concentrations: Queens—2,567 people, and Brooklyn—1,313.
 In Manhattan, Bangladeshis formed a small enclave on 6th Street. Larger numbers lived in the Astoria area of Queens.
 2000 census:
 Total population: 28,269
 Highest concentrations: Queens—18,310 people (65%), Brooklyn—6,243 (22%), Bronx—2,442 (9%), Manhattan—1,204 (4%), Staten Island—70 (0.2%)
 Population growth rate from 1970 to 2000: 471%
 Foreign-born population: 23,157 (85%)
 Limited English proficiency: 14,840 (60%)
 Median Household Income: $31,537
 People Living in Poverty: 8,312
 Percentage of people in poverty: 31%
 2010 census:
 Total population: 50,677
 Highest concentrations: Queens (60%), Brooklyn (19%), Bronx (17%), Manhattan (4%), Staten Island (0.4%)
 Population growth rate from 2000 to 2010:
 Foreign-born population: 74%
 Limited English proficiency: 53%
 Median Household Income: $36,741
 Percentage of people in poverty: 32%

Bangladeshi neighborhoods in NYC include Jamaica, Jamaica Hills, Briarwood, Jackson Heights, Woodside, Elmhurst, Hollis, Queens Village, Hunters Point, Long Island City, East Harlem, Bayside, Hillcrest, West Maspeth and Astoria in Queens; Kensington and City Line in Brooklyn. Parkchester and Castle Hill in The Bronx is also home to an increasing Bangladeshi population Other, smaller Little Bangladesh communities can be found in Philadelphia, Washington, D.C., Detroit, and Los Angeles.

Paterson, New Jersey

Paterson, New Jersey, in the New York City metropolitan area, is home to a significant and growing Bangladeshi American community. Many Bangladeshi grocery stores and clothing stores are locating in the emerging Little Bangladesh on Union Avenue and the surrounding streets in Paterson, as well as a branch of the Sonali Exchange Company Inc., a subsidiary of Sonali Bank, the largest state-owned financial institution in Bangladesh. Masjid Al-Ferdous is also located on Union Avenue, which accommodates Paterson's rapidly growing Bangladeshi pedestrian population in Paterson. Mohammed Akhtaruzzaman was ultimately certified as the winner of the 2012 city council race in the Second Ward, making him northern New Jersey's first Bangladeshi-American elected official. The current 2nd Ward Councilman is Bangladeshi Shahin Khalique, who defeated Akhtaruzzaman in 2016 as well as in 2020. He has been a big reason for the growth and advancement of the Bengali community in Paterson. On 11 October 2014, the groundbreaking ceremony for the Shohid Minar Monument in West Side Park in Paterson took place, paying tribute to people killed in Pakistan in 1952 while protesting that country's policies that banned Bangladeshis from speaking their Bangla (বাংলা) language, and replicating those monuments that exist in Bangladesh, according to the World Glam Organization, the Bangladeshi cultural group working on the Paterson project. The Shohid Minar was completed and unveiled in 2015. This project reflected the increasing influence of Paterson's growing Bangladeshi community, as reported in The Record.

Community and economic issues

Per capita income
In 2014, identified by factfinder census, when Americans per capita income was divided by ethnic groups Bangladeshi Americans were revealed to have a per capita income of only $18,027, below the American average of $25,825.

Median household income
In 2015, Bangladeshi Americans had an estimated median household income of $49,800, lower than the overall American median of $53,600.

In 2019, Bangladeshi Americans had a median household income of $59,500.

Poverty
According to a news article from the website Mashable released in 2015, 26% of the Bangladeshi American community lived under the poverty line. This is much higher than the USA average of 16% according to data released by the Economic Policy Institute in 2011.

In a 2013, NPR discussion with a member of the Economic Policy Institute and co-author of the book The Myth of the Model Minority Rosalind Chou who is also a professor of sociology. One of them stated that "When you break it down by specific ethnic groups, the Tamil ,the Bangladeshi, they have poverty rates that rival the African-American poverty rate."

Education

The 2000 census undertaken by the Census Bureau listed 57,412 people identifying themselves as having Bangladeshi origin. Almost 40% of Bangladeshis over the age of 25 had at least a bachelor's degree as compared to less than 25% of the United States population.

Politics 
Bangladeshi Americans strongly favor the Democratic Party. The preference towards the Democratic Party was initially influenced in part by Republican President Richard Nixon's support of Pakistan during Bangladesh's struggle for independence. In the 2012 United States presidential election, 96% of Bangladeshi Americans voted for Barack Obama's reelection. In the 2016 United States presidential election, 90% of Bangladeshi Americans voted for Hillary Clinton. In the 2020 United States presidential election, the vast majority of Bangladeshi Americans favored Joe Biden. A exit poll conducted by AALDEF showed that a majority (91%) of Bangladeshi Americans backed Joe Biden in the 2020 presidential election.

In recent decades, the Bangladeshi American community has become more active in local and national politics, with many Bangladeshi Americans seeking office or forming political organizations to better represent those within or outside the community who share similar goals.

Culture 
Bangladeshi Americans are well represented in the fields of medicine, engineering, business, finance and information technology. Bangladeshi Americans have brought Bengali cuisine to the United States. There are many Bangladeshi markets and stores in the United States.  Some of the largest are in New York City, Paterson, New Jersey, Central New Jersey, Washington, D.C., Atlantic City, and Los Angeles.

Languages
Bangladeshi Americans often retain their native language Bengali and run many programs to nourish their mothertongue. Many also speak Bengali dialects or other languages related to Bengali, the most common being Sylheti which is spoken by Bangladeshis from the Sylhet Division, and Chittagonian which is spoken by Bangladeshis from the districts of Chittagong and Cox's Bazar.

Religion
Before the colonization of South Asia by Great Britain, folk religion across villages in the Bengal region incorporated practices from Hinduism, Buddhism, and Islam to varying degrees. Leading up to the modern era, Bengali families increasingly began identifying with a single religious community. In North America, Bangladeshis outside of metropolitan areas often practice their faiths at home and make special trips during community holidays like Ramadan and Durga Puja. In cities like Detroit and New York, Muslims in the Bangladeshi American community hold religious services within mosques in their own communities. There are major Hindu temples in the United States where Bangladeshi Americans have played an important part in the leadership of congregations.

Notable people

Muhammad Ali – professional boxer and activist. He was a Bangladeshi citizen and held a Bangladeshi passport
Mir Masoom Ali – George and Frances Ball Distinguished Professor of Statistics, Ball State University
Arianna Afsar – former Miss California; placed in the Top 10 of the 2011 Miss America pageant
Saif Ahmad – World Series of Poker winner
Maqsudul Alam (d. 2014)– scientist and professor at University of Hawaii
Rais Bhuiyan – shooting survivor and activist
Hansen Clarke – United States Congress in 2010, from Michigan's House of Representatives
 Naeem Mohaiemen, Academician, filmmaker, writer, visual artist
Hasan M. Elahi – interdisciplinary media artist
Firoz Mahmud – interdisciplinary media artist
M. Zahid Hasan, scientist and professor of quantum physics at Princeton University- known for seminal discoveries in quantum physics. Fellow of American Academy of Arts and Sciences.
Fazle Hussain – professor of mechanical engineering, and earth science at the University of Houston
Abul Hussam – chemist. Inventor of the Sono arsenic filter
Omar Ishrak - business executive, chairman of Intel and Medtronic
 Abdus Suttar Khan – chemist and jet fuels inventor
 Badrul Khan – founder of modern e-learning
 Fazlur Rahman Khan – pioneer of modern structural engineering
 Salman Khan – founder of Khan Academy, a nonprofit educational organisation
 Jawed Karim  co-founder of YouTube; designed key parts of PayPal
 Imran Khan (businessman) – Tech investor and entrepreneur. Chief Strategy Officer of Snap Inc, Leading Alibaba Group IPO, leading Snap IPO
 Shuvo Roy – Co-invention of artificial kidney, medical MEMS, Bangladeshi-American scientist and engineer.
 Mohammad Ataul Karim – electrical engineer
 Sumaya Kazi – founder of Sumazi, recognised by BusinessWeek as one of America's Best Young Entrepreneurs.
 Sezan Mahmud – award-winning novelist
 Shomi Patwary – designer and music video director
 Iqbal Quadir – founder of Grameenphone, Bangladesh's largest mobile phone company; headed the MIT Legatum Center 
 Kamal Quadir – entrepreneur; founded two of Bangladesh's key technology companies, CellBazaar and bKash
 Anika Rahman – CEO of Ms. Foundation for Women
 Badal Roy – tabla player, percussionist, and recording artist
 Reihan Salam – conservative American political commentator; blogger at The American Scene; associate editor of The Atlantic Monthly
 Shikhee – singer; auteur of industrial band Android Lust
 Sanjoy, Bangladeshi–American musician, electronic music producer and DJ
  Jai Wolf, electronic music producer
 Asif Azam Siddiqi – space historian; assistant professor of history at Fordham University
 M. Osman Siddique – former US ambassador
 Palbasha Siddique – singer
 Marjana Chowdhury – Bangladeshi-American model, philanthropist and beauty queen Miss Bangladesh USA
 Monica Yunus – Bangladeshi-Russian-American operatic soprano
 Anik Khan - Bangladeshi-American rapper.

See also

 Asian Americans in New York City
 Chinese people in New York City
 Demographics of New York City
 Filipinos in the New York metropolitan area
 Fuzhounese in New York City
 Indians in the New York City metropolitan region
 Japanese in New York City
 Koreans in New York City
 Russians in New York City
 Taiwanese people in New York City
 Bengali diaspora
 Bengali Americans
 Little Bangladesh, Los Angeles

References

Further reading
 Bald, Vivak. Bengali Harlem and the Lost Histories of South Asian America (Harvard University Press, 2013).
 Baluja, Kagri Glagstad. Gender Roles at Home and Abroad: The Adaptation of Bangladeshi Immigrants (LFB Scholarly Publications, 2003).
 Harris, Michael S. "Bangladeshis," in American Immigrant Cultures: Builders of a Nation, edited by David Levinson and Melvin Ember. (Macmillan Reference, 1997).
 Jones, J. Sydney. "Bangladeshi Americans." in Gale Encyclopedia of Multicultural America, edited by Thomas Riggs, (3rd ed., vol. 1, Gale, 2014), pp. 221–235.  online

External links

  American Institute of Bangladesh Studies
  Bangladesh American Center
 US Census 2000 foreign born population by country
 Asian American Federation Census information
  Books

 
Bangladeshi diaspora
 
Asian-American society
South Asian American